Downing Provincial Park is a provincial park in British Columbia, Canada, created when Mr. and Mrs. Clair Downing donated their half-mile of lake frontage property on Kelly Lake. The park's size, including the  donated by the Downings, is 156 hectares. It is located adjacent to the British Columbia Railway line and the Pavilion Mountain Road about 30 km west of Clinton, at the junction with the road to Jesmond and Kostering.

See also
Edge Hills Provincial Park

References

Provincial parks of British Columbia
Thompson-Nicola Regional District
Year of establishment missing